Diocese of Minsk may refer to the following ecclesiastical jurisdictions with episcopal see in the Belarusian city of Minsk :

 the current Diocese of Minsk  of the Belarusian Orthodox Church which is under the rule of the Russian Orthodox Church.
 the former Latin Diocese of Minsk, merged into the present Roman Catholic Archdiocese of Minsk-Mohilev